FromSoftware, Inc. is a Japanese video game development and publishing company based in Tokyo. Founded by Naotoshi Zin in November 1986, the company developed business software before releasing their first video game, King's Field, for the PlayStation in 1994. Its success shifted FromSoftware to focus fully on video games, with them producing two more King's Field games before creating the mecha combat series Armored Core (1997), one of their flagship franchises. 

By the 2000s, FromSoftware lineup also included the Echo Night, Shadow Tower, Lost Kingdoms, Otogi, and Another Century's Episode series. The company would achieve breakout success in the 2010s, spurred by Demon's Souls (2009) and Dark Souls (2011), the latter being the first entry in a trilogy whose success led to the creation of a subgenre of action role-playing games known as Soulslikes. These include Bloodborne (2015), Sekiro: Shadows Die Twice (2019), and Elden Ring (2022), which are often listed among the greatest video games of all time.

Hidetaka Miyazaki, creator of the Dark Souls series, has served as FromSoftware's representative director and president since 2014, with Zin remaining as an advisor. Despite his executive role, Miyazaki continues to direct the majority of the company's games. The company is owned primarily by Kadokawa Corporation with minority stakes by Sixjoy Hong Kong, a subsidiary of Tencent, and Sony Interactive Entertainment. FromSoftware usually self-publishes in Japan and partners with larger companies to publish internationally, including Agetec, Sony, and Bandai Namco Entertainment.

History

FromSoftware was founded in Tokyo by Naotoshi Zin on November 1, 1986, as a software developer of business applications. The company released its first game, King's Field, for the PlayStation in 1994. Despite its commercial success in Japan, the game was not released in other regions, although 1995's King's Field II was released in both North America and Europe in 1996. After releasing King's Field III, FromSoftware went on to release the horror game Echo Night and the 1998 role-playing game Shadow Tower. In 1997, FromSoftware released Armored Core, the first release in their flagship Armored Core series of mecha combat games.

With the launch of the PlayStation 2 in 2000, FromSoftware released the role-playing games Eternal Ring and Evergrace. In 2003, FromSoftware published Tenchu: Wrath of Heaven, a stealth game that combines action and adventure elements. The company also released King's Field IV and Shadow Tower Abyss, in addition to the Lost Kingdoms series for the GameCube. The company also made a few games exclusive to the Xbox around this time, such as Murakumo: Renegade Mech Pursuit, Otogi: Myth of Demons, Otogi 2: Immortal Warriors, Metal Wolf Chaos, and Chromehounds In 2005, FromSoftware would start to produce a series of licensed games based on the various anime properties under the banner Another Century's Episode. The same year, the company hosted the video game industry's first internship that let students experience game development through a game creation kit, Adventure Player, for the PlayStation Portable. 

FromSoftware underwent a stock split in 2008 before achieving breakout success in the 2010s, spurred by the release of Demon's Souls (2009) and Dark Souls (2011), the latter being the first entry in a trilogy whose success led to the creation of a subgenre of action role-playing games known as Soulslikes. These include Dark Souls II (2014), Bloodborne (2015), Dark Souls III, Sekiro: Shadows Die Twice (2019), and Elden Ring (2022), which have all received several awards and are often listed among the greatest video games of all time.

In April 2014, Kadokawa Corporation announced its intention to purchase the company from former shareholder Transcosmos. Following other restructuring, Souls creator Hidetaka Miyazaki would be promoted to company president the following month and later given the title of representative director.
In January 2016, FromSoftware established a studio in Fukuoka that focuses on creating computer-generated imagery (CGI) assets for their games. In August 2022, Sixjoy Hong Kong (a subsidiary of Tencent) and Sony Interactive Entertainment respectively acquired 16.25% and 14.09% of FromSoftware, leaving 69.66% to Kadokawa. 

A report published by GamesIndustry.biz in November 2022 said that FromSoftware paid their employees at sub-standard rates.

Games

References

External links
 

Japanese companies established in 1986
Software companies based in Tokyo
Kadokawa Corporation subsidiaries
Japanese brands
Video game companies of Japan
Video game companies established in 1986
Video game development companies
Video game publishers
2014 mergers and acquisitions
Tencent
Sony Interactive Entertainment
Golden Joystick Award winners